Soini Mikael Nikkinen (19 July 1923 – 2 June 2012) was a Finnish javelin thrower who won a bronze medal at the 1954 European Championships. He placed 12th and 8th at the 1948 and 1952 Summer Olympics, respectively. On 24 June 1956, he set a new world record at 83.56 m, which was beaten six days later by Janusz Sidło.

References

External links

Soini Nikkinen's profile at Sports Reference.com
European Championships
Soini Nikkinen's obituary 

1923 births
2012 deaths
People from Kiuruvesi
Athletes (track and field) at the 1948 Summer Olympics
Athletes (track and field) at the 1952 Summer Olympics
Finnish male javelin throwers
Olympic athletes of Finland
European Athletics Championships medalists
Sportspeople from North Savo